Calcarisporiellales is an order of fungi within the phylum of Calcarisporiellomycota and in the class Calcarisporiellomycetes. It contains 2 known families, Calcarisporiella, and Echinochlamydosporium. The 2 genera each have 1 species.

Taxonomy
 Phylum Mucoromyceta Tedersoo et al., Fungal Diversity 90 (1): 151 (2018)
 Class Calcarisporiellomycetes Tedersoo et al., Fungal Diversity 90 (1): 152 (2018)
 Order Calcarisporiellales Tedersoo et al.
 Family Calcarisporiellaceae Tedersoo et al.
 Genus Calcarisporiella de Hoog, 1974
 Species Calcarisporiella thermophila 
 Genus Echinochlamydosporium  X.Z. Jiang, H.Y. Yu, M.C. Xiang, X.Y. Liu & Xing Z. Liu, 2011
 Species Echinochlamydosporium variabile

History
Calcarisporiella was originally published in 1974 and originally thought to be an anamorphic member of the Pezizomycotina division. (Evans 1971 and de Hoog 1974), but later phylogenetic analysis of rDNA found that it was separate from the Endogonales and Mucorales clades.

A new genus, Echinochlamydosporium, was described in 2011 and placed in Mortierellaceae family. Then in 2018, due to DNA analysis, Echinochlamydosporium was transferred to the Calcarisporiellaceae family.

The newly described Calcarisporiellomycota phylum nov. (comprising Calcarisporiella thermophila and Echinochlamydosporium variabile) represented a deep lineage with strongest affinities to Mucoromycota, (Yamamoto et al. 2015) or Mortierellomycota (Jiang et al. 2011; Tedersoo et al. 2017).

Phylogenetic tree of the combined data set of the 28S nrDNA gene, tef1, and rpb1 (data set 2). Phylogenetic relationships of four new species (red) of Endogonaceae and other species including plant mycobionts in Endogonales were found. It determined that Mortierellaceae and Calcarisporiellaceae are used as outgroups.

General description
They have a thallus that is branched, with septate (has a singular septum) hyphae. The vegetative hyphae is hyaline (has a glassy appearance), smooth and thin-walled. It has cultures with no distinctive smell. The sporangiophores (a receptacle in ferns which bears the sporangia, if present) simple, hyaline, smooth, arising from undifferentiated hyphae. The sporangia is unispored, ellipsoid (in shape), with or without a small columella. Spores are uninucleate (having a single nucleus), hyaline, smooth, thin-walled, ovoid to ellipsoid, with a rounded base.
Chlamydospores (if present) is born laterally on short hyphae, they are 1-celled, elongate to globose, thick-walled and spiny. The sexual cycle not known, but they are saprotrophic in soil and non-nematophagous (not carnivorous).

It can be found in soils.

References

External links 

Fungi